Gnathmocerodes tonsoria is a moth of the family Tortricidae first described by Edward Meyrick in 1909. It is found in Sri Lanka.

Its larval food plant is Barringtonia racemosa.

References

Moths of Asia
Moths described in 1909